Daniel Bentley may refer to:
 Daniel Bentley (footballer) (born 1993), English footballer
 Daniel Bentley (minister) (1850–1916), American minister, writer, newspaper founder
 Dan Bentley (born 1984), English paralympic boccia player